The Madness of Crowds is a 2009 album by English progressive rock artist Troy Donockley. It is Donockley's third solo album, and his first since he began performing with Nightwish. The album features Nightwish founder Tuomas Holopainen reciting the poem "Song of Myself" by Walt Whitman in the song "Now, Voyager".

The album was recorded at Waterworld Studios, East Yorkshire, UK and various other locations in early 2009. It was mixed at The Chapel Studios, Lincolnshire by Ewan Davies and mastered by Denis Blackham at Skyemasters. The album cover sculptures are from The Brutish Museum by Alastair Dickson and photographed by Sean Tamblyn.

Track listing

Credits
Musicians
 Troy Donockley – uilleann pipes, low/high whistles, acoustic/electric guitars, Bouzouki, keyboards, mandolin, percussion & vocals
 Joanne Hogg – vocals
 Nick Holland – vocals
 Barbara Dickson – vocals
 Heather Findlay – vocals
 Brad Lang – double bass & fretless bass
 Frank van Essen – violins, viola, drums & percussion
 Rosie Biss – cello
 Tuomas Holopainen, John Butterworth, Caroline Hayden, Jonsu Salomaa, John Hayden, Karen Butterworth, Nick Holland, Barbara Dickson, Russell Field, Sue Lindley, Terri Donockley, Tim Martindale, Pete Zorn, Poppy, Archie Cookson, Trevor Leroyd, Ben Lindley, Bradders, Mia Donockley, Bryan Josh and Ike Maltby – spoken words (on track 4)
 Lucy Muir – harp
 Daniel Gregg – oboe
 Peter Carter – clarinet
 Vita Dowd – flute
 Martin Vanderhoff – bassoon

Technical personnel
 Ewan Davies – engineering
 Tim Martindale – cover design, photography and layout
 Alastair Dickson – album cover sculptures (from The Brutish Museum)
 Sean Tamblyn – photos of sculptures
 Denis Blackham – mastering (at Skyemasters)

References

2009 albums
Troy Donockley albums